This is a list in alphabetical order of cricketers who have played for Derbyshire County Cricket Club in top-class matches since it was founded in 1870. Derbyshire was a first-class team from 1871 to 1887 but was then demoted until its status was restored in 1895. Derbyshire have been a List A team since the beginning of limited overs cricket in 1963 and a top-class Twenty20 team since the inauguration of the Twenty20 Cup in 2003.

The details are the player's usual name followed by the years in which he was active as a Derbyshire player and then his name is given as it would appear on match scorecards. Note that many players represented other top-class teams besides Derbyshire. Current players are shown as active to the latest season in which they played for the club. The list excludes Second XI and other players who did not play for the club's first team; and players whose first team appearances were in minor matches only. The list has been updated to the end of the 2021 cricket season using the data published in Playfair Cricket Annual, 2022 edition.

A

B

C

D

E

F

G

H

I
 Richard Illingworth (2001) : R. K. Illingworth
 Imran Tahir (2017) : Imran Tahir
 Clive Inman (1973) : C. C. Inman

J

K

L

M

N

O

P

Q
 Hamidullah Qadri (2017–2019) : H. Qadri

R

S

T

U
 Usman Khawaja (2011–2012) : Usman Khawaja

V
 Logan van Beek (2019–2021) : L. V. van Beek
 Matthew Vandrau (1993–1997) : M. J. Vandrau
 Pat Vaulkhard (1946–1952) : P. Vaulkhard
 Srinivasaraghavan Venkataraghavan (1973–1975) : S. Venkataraghavan
 Hardus Viljoen (2017–2018) : G. C. Viljoen

W

Y
 George Yates (1883) : G. Yates
 John Young (1899–1901) : J. H. Young
 John Young (1894) : J. W. Young

See also
 List of Derbyshire County Cricket Club captains

Notes

References

Players

Derbyshire
Cricketers